Jackanory is a BBC children's television series which was originally broadcast between 13 December 1965 to 24 March 1996. The show's format was designed to stimulate an interest in reading, and usually involved an actor reading an abridged version of a children's novel or folk tale whilst seated in an armchair. A single book would usually occupy five daily fifteen-minute episodes from Monday to Friday, and occasionally the scene being read would be illustrated by a specially commissioned still drawing.

Footnotes

References

Lists of British children's television series episodes